Volhynian District was a district of Second Polish Republic from 1920 to 1921. Its capital was Lutsk. It was formed on 20 December 1920 from Volhynian District of the freshly disestablished Provisional Administration of Front-line and Phase Territories. On 19 February 1921 it was reformed into Volhynian Voivodeship.

History 
Volhynian District was established as the district of Second Polish Republic on 20 December 1920. It was formed from Volhynian District. It replaced the administration of the Provisional Administration of Front-line and Phase Territories in the region. The region was governed by the Chief of District, a public official, who was a representative of the Council of Ministers, responsible for the implementation of the laws as well as superior to local administration offices.

From Volhynian District were included 10 counties: Dubno, Horochów, Kowel, Krzemieniec, Luboml, Łuck, Ostróg County, Równe, Sarny and Włodzimierz.

On 19 February 1921, the district was reformed into Volhynian Voivodeship.

Subdivision

Counties 
Dubno County
Horochów County
Kowel County
Krzemieniec County
Luboml County
Łuck County
Ostróg County
Równe County
Sarny County
Włodzimierz County

Notes

References 

States and territories established in 1920
States and territories disestablished in 1921
1920 establishments in Poland
1921 disestablishments in Poland
Districts of the Second Polish Republic
Wołyń Voivodeship (1921–1939)
History of Volhynia